Colabris is a genus of flies in the family Empididae.

Species
C. coxalis Melander, 1928
C. rufescens Melander, 1928

References

Empidoidea genera
Empididae